Megalomys luciae, also known as the Saint Lucia pilorie or Saint Lucia giant rice-rat, as well as several variant spellings, is an extinct rodent that lived on the island of Saint Lucia in the eastern Caribbean. It was the size of a small cat, and it had a darker belly than Megalomys desmarestii, a closely related species from Martinique, and slender claws. Some other physical features that this rodent species have are brown/ochre dorsal coloration and white soft fur patches. They have webbed hind feet, smooth heels with interdigital pads, and slender claws. Their tail is longer than the length of their whole body from head to toe, the tail contains sparse hairs and is mainly covered with epidermal scales. Their skulls are very delicate with an amphora shape.
The last known specimen died in the London Zoo in 1852, after three years of captivity. It probably became extinct in the latter half of the 19th century, with the last record dating from 1881. There is a stuffed specimen in the collection of the Natural History Museum in London.

References

Literature cited
Flannery, T. and Schouten, P. 2001. A Gap in Nature: Discovering the World's Extinct Animals. London: William Heinemann.  (UK edition)
Musser, G.G. and Carleton, M.D. 2005. Superfamily Muroidea. Pp. 894–1531 in Wilson, D.E. and Reeder, D.M. (eds.). Mammal Species of the World: a taxonomic and geographic reference. 3rd ed. Baltimore: The Johns Hopkins University Press, 2 vols., 2142 pp. 
Ray, C.E. 1962. The Oryzomyine Rodents of the Antillean Subregion. Doctor of Philosophy thesis, Harvard University, 211 pp.

  Turvey, S. T. (2012). A new species of recently extinct rice rat (Megalomys) from Barbados. Mammalian Biology Zeitschrift Für Säugetierkunde., 77(6), 404–413. 

Extinct rodents
Rodent extinctions since 1500
Fauna of Saint Lucia
Megalomys
Mammals described in 1901
Mammals of the Caribbean